Ben Lomond is a mountain in Scotland east of Loch Lomond.

Ben Lomond may also refer to:

Places

Australia 
Ben Lomond bioregion, a biogeographic region in Tasmania
Ben Lomond (Tasmania), a mountain located in the biogeographic region
Ben Lomond, New South Wales, a town in Australia's New England region
Ben Lomond, Tasmania, a locality

Canada
Ben Lomond (North Shore Mountains), a mountain in British Columbia, Canada

New Zealand 
Ben Lomond (Waikato), a lava dome in Waikato in the North Island of New Zealand
Ben Lomond (Otago), a mountain in the South Island of New Zealand

United States 
Ben Lomond, Arkansas, a town in Sevier County, Arkansas
Ben Lomond, California, a census-designated place (CDP) in Santa Cruz County, California
Ben Lomond Mountain AVA, a wine region in Santa Cruz County, California
Ben Lomond High School, a secondary school in Ogden, Utah
Ben Lomond Mountain (Utah), a mountain peak in the Wasatch Range of northern Utah
Ben Lomond (Colorado), a small mountain in the vicinity of Palmer Lake, Colorado
Ben Lomond, West Virginia, an unincorporated community in Mason County, West Virginia
Ben Lomond Plantation, an 1832 plantation near Manassas, Virginia, used as a hospital during the American Civil War
Ben Lomond Mountain (Tennessee), a mountain peak in Warren County, Tennessee
Ben Lomond, a mountain peak in Plumas County, California

Other Uses 
SS Ben Lomond (1872) a vessel which operated on Lake Wakatipu in New Zealand
SS Benlomond, one of a number of merchant vessels including
 SS Benlomond (1922), a merchant vessel sunk in World War II
Ben Lomond, a village in Aberdeen District, Saint Elizabeth Parish, Jamaica
Ben Lomond Village, a hamlet located in the metropolitan area of San Fernando, Trinidad and Tobago